Le Papillon des étoiles (The Butterfly of the Stars) is a 2006 novel by French author Bernard Werber.

Description
It describes a generation ship under the form of a long rotating cylinder, with central lightning tube. This ship is said to be privately constructed. Aboard the vessel, 144,000 people leave Earth to travel to an exoplanet. The voyage takes 1,000 years.

References

2006 French novels
Novels by Bernard Werber
French science fiction novels
2006 science fiction novels
Éditions Albin Michel books